Stefan Ruppert (born  Ma 19) is a former German politician of the Free Democratic Party (FDP) who served as a member of the Bundestag from the state of Hesse from 2009 until 2013 and from 2017 until 2020.

Early life and career 
After graduating from the bilingual (German/French) branch of the draught school in Frankfurt am Main in 1991, Ruppert did community service with the German Red Cross (DRK) in the field of geriatric care. 

From 1992 Ruppert studied law, political science and history at the Goethe University Frankfurt and took his first state examination in 1997. In 2001, he received his doctorate with his dissertation on Canon Law and the Kulturkampf and was awarded the Otto Hahn Medal. In 2003 he completed the second state examination in law after a two-year academic work at the Federal Constitutional Court.

Political career 
Ruppert joined the FDP in 1990. In the 2009 federal elections, he entered the German Bundestag via the Hesse state list. He was a member of the Committee on Internal Affairs and his parliamentary group’s spokesperson on churches and religious communities. Due to the FDP's failure to reach the five percent hurdle in the 2013 federal elections, he left the Bundestag. 

Ruppert became a member of the Bundestag again in the 2017 German federal election. There he was parliamentary manager of the FDP parliamentary group until January 2020.

From 2018 until 2020, Ruppert was part of a cross-party working group on a reform of Germany’s electoral system, chaired by Wolfgang Schäuble.

Other activities 
 Friedrich Naumann Foundation, Member of the Board of Trustees (since 2021)

References

External links 

  
 Bundestag biography 
 

 

1971 births
Living people
Members of the Bundestag for Hesse
Members of the Bundestag 2017–2021
Members of the Bundestag 2009–2013
Members of the Bundestag for the Free Democratic Party (Germany)